Skandalon (from the Greek σκανδαλον) may refer to:
Stumbling block, in the Bible, a behavior or attitude that leads another to sin
Scandal, an action that damages someone's reputation
a 1970 work by René Kalisky

See also
Scandal (disambiguation)